Washington Carlos Nunes Rodrigues (Rio de Janeiro, September 1, 1936), also known as Apolinho is a Brazilian radio sports and football broadcaster of Super Rádio Tupi.

Declared fan of Flamengo, Apolinho assumed the technical command of the equipment in the year of 1995.

Regarding his passage as coach of Flamengo, Apolinho stated:

"I'm not a coach and I've never been, but Flamengo did not invite me, he summoned me. And every time he calls me I go, for Flamengo I do anything, if the goalkeeper gets hurt and needs me on the goal I go there and play, for Flamengo I do any business, if called I'm in, anything, I go."

References

1936 births
Living people
Brazilian sports broadcasters
Brazilian sports journalists
Association football commentators
Football people in Brazil
Brazilian football managers
Footballers from Rio de Janeiro (city)